Paul Bourdillon (born 12 November 1964) is a Zimbabwean cricketer. He played two first-class matches for Mashonaland in 1993/94.

See also
 List of Mashonaland first-class cricketers

References

External links
 

1964 births
Living people
Zimbabwean cricketers
Mashonaland cricketers
Cricketers from Mutare